No More Shall We Part is the eleventh studio album by Nick Cave and the Bad Seeds, released on 2 April 2001 in the UK (and 10 April in the US). The record, which was well received critically, came after a 4-year gap from recording, following the much acclaimed album The Boatman's Call and subsequent 'Best Of' album.

Nick Cave had to overcome heavy heroin and alcohol addictions in 1999–2000 before starting work on the album. It featured guest appearances by Kate & Anna McGarrigle and was met with mostly positive reviews. At Metacritic, which assigns a normalised rating out of 100 based on reviews from mainstream critics, the album has received a generally favourable score of 79, based on 18 reviews. One critic hailed it as an "entire album of deeply tragic and beautiful love songs without irony, sarcasm, or violent resolution", while also stating that the work is at risk of devolving "into schmaltz".

Track listing 
The album showcases the virtuoso talents of the Bad Seeds, with elaborate instrumental sections on nearly every track. Additionally, Cave's lyrics are less obscure than usual, and he sings in a wider vocal range than he had previously, reaching alto on several tracks.

 "Darker with the Day"  utilises the chordal structure and melody of the rearranged piano version of "Papa Won't Leave You, Henry" (from Henry's Dream) performed by Cave in 2000.

A limited-edition version included a bonus disc with two extra tracks, plus multi-media CD-ROM files (the 2 bonus tracks also appeared on the UK double 12" vinyl pressing of the album):

The bonus disc also includes an enhanced section featuring lyrics, photo gallery, biography, album discography, interview, and internet links.

Singles 
 "As I Sat Sadly by Her Side" (MUTE 249) (19 March 2001)
 "As I Sat Sadly by Her Side" – 6:13
 "Little Janey's Gone" – 3:00
 "Good Good Day" – 4:05
 "Fifteen Feet of Pure White Snow" (MUTE 262) (21 May 2001)
 "Fifteen Feet of Pure White Snow" (Single Version) – 4:07
 "God Is in the House" (Westside Session) – 5:52
 "We Came Along This Road" (Westside Session) – 5:38
 "Love Letter" (special limited edition Australia-only release, MUTE 284) (25 February 2002)
 "Love Letter" – 4:05
 "Fifteen Feet of Pure White Snow" (Westside Session) – 5:43
 "And No More Shall We Part" (Westside Session) – 4:09
 "God Is in the House" (Westside Session) – 5:52
 "We Came Along This Road" (Westside Session) – 5:38

Personnel 
Nick Cave and the Bad Seeds
 Nick Cave – vocals, piano
 Mick Harvey – guitar, string arrangement, drums on track 1
 Blixa Bargeld – guitar
 Conway Savage – organ
 Warren Ellis – violin, string arrangement
 Martyn P. Casey – bass
 Thomas Wydler – drums
 Jim Sclavunos – drums on track 4, percussion on track 5
 All male backing vocals by Nick Cave & The Bad Seeds
Guest musicians
 Kate & Anna McGarrigle – vocals
 Gavyn Wright, Patrick Kiernan, Jackie Shave, Simon Fischer, Rebecca Hirsch – violins
 Bruce White, Gustav Clarkson – violas
 Frank Schaefer, Lionel Handy, Naomi Wright – cellos
 Paul Morgan, Leon Bosch – basses

Production 
 Produced by Nick Cave and the Bad Seeds and Tony Cohen
 Recorded at Abbey Road Studios, London and Westside Studios, London
 Engineered by Tony Cohen and Kevin Paul
 Assistant Engineers: Mirek Stiles (Abbey Road) and Mark Bishop (Westside)
 Mixed by Tony Cohen, Nick Cave, Blixa Bargeld and Mick Harvey at Westside Studios
 Mastered by Ray Staff at Whitfield Street, London

Certifications and sales

Exhibitions inspired by the album
In 2019, Greek artist Stefanos Rokos, presented his artistic approach to the album "No More Shall We Part" by Nick Cave & The Bad Seeds, an art exhibition that started its journey in Greece and travelled to Antwerp, Belgium. The NMSWP part project is a testimony of Stefanos Rokos' personal proposal for a dialectic to be developed between two artistic forms- those of painting and songwriting, which have all along constituted the very core of artistic expression and creativity.

Nick Cave said about the paintings: "It was extraordinary to stand in the studio and see the paintings for real – the grandeur of them, with all their congested details and terrifying blank spaces. I feel connected to the essence of them. I feel they are very close to the way I write lyrics – intense bursts of memory, ecstatic detail, sudden erotics, esoteric imagery; the forging of frozen narratives that hover about like dreams, haunted and strange and life-affirming."

References

External links 
 

2001 albums
ARIA Award-winning albums
Nick Cave albums
Mute Records albums
Albums produced by Tony Cohen